Traian Alexandru Marc (born 16 January 1983 in Braşov, Romania) is a former Romanian footballer who played as a goalkeeper.

Marc was promoted from FC Brașov's youth team at the beginning of the 2002–03 season of Divizia A. After only 10 league matches in three years he was transferred to Politehnica Iași, where he was the second-choice goalkeeper. He returned to FC Brașov in 2010 and two years later he was loaned to Corona Brașov. In 2014, when his contract with FC Brașov expired, Marc signed a deal for three years with Dinamo București. He was released by Dinamo in 2015 and reached an agreement with CFR Cluj.

Marc is a former U-21 international.

Honours

Club
CFR Cluj
Cupa României: 2015–16

References

External links

 

1983 births
Living people
Sportspeople from Brașov
Romanian footballers
Association football goalkeepers
FC Brașov (1936) players
FC Politehnica Iași (1945) players
CSM Corona Brașov footballers
FC Dinamo București players
CFR Cluj players
Liga I players
Romania under-21 international footballers